Fred Winchester Sladen (November 24, 1867 – July 10, 1945) was career United States Army officer who rose to the rank of major general and became Superintendent of the United States Military Academy. He was a son of English-born Joseph A. Sladen (1841-1911) and Martha F. Winchester. The elder Sladen met with Cochise in the company of General Oliver Otis Howard, and was awarded the Medal of Honor for his service in the American Civil War.

Early life
Sladen was born on November 24, 1867 in Lowell, Massachusetts, the son of Joseph Alton Sladen and Martha (Winchester) Sladen.

Education
Sladen received his appointment to the US Military Academy from the State of Nebraska, graduating 27th out of 54 in his class of 1890.

Military career
Sladen began his military career commissioned an officer in the Infantry branch upon graduating from the US Military Academy. From 1911 to 1914 he was commandant of cadets.

During World War I, Sladen served as commander of the 5th Infantry Brigade, part of the Third Infantry Division. He was awarded the Distinguished Service Cross and the Distinguished Service Medal for his wartime service. On October 14, 1918, learning that his brigade's advance had stalled near Ferme de la Madeleine, France, Sladen proceeded three kilometers to the front lines under heavy enemy fire to investigate. Discovering that the battalion commander had been killed, he took direct command himself and was able to resume the attack.

He served in the army until his retirement on November 30, 1931. He achieved the rank of major general and was the 32nd superintendent of US Military Academy from 1922 to 1926. He later served as superintendent of Fort McHenry from 1931 to 1932.

Personal life
Sladen married Ms. Elizabeth Lefferts of New York City on October 8, 1903 at the Church of the Holy Incarnation on Madison Avenue.  One of Sladen's groomsmen was another future West Point Superintendent, William D. Connor. Their son Fred Winchester Sladen Jr. was a West Point graduate and decorated battalion commander during World War II who retired as a brigadier general.

Death 
Sladen died in New London, New Hampshire on July 10, 1945.

References

1867 births
1945 deaths
United States Military Academy alumni
Military personnel from Massachusetts
United States Army Infantry Branch personnel
American military personnel of the Philippine–American War
Commandants of the Corps of Cadets of the United States Military Academy
United States Army generals of World War I
Recipients of the Distinguished Service Cross (United States)
Recipients of the Distinguished Service Medal (US Army)
United States Army generals
Superintendents of the United States Military Academy
Burials at West Point Cemetery